Vladislav Olegovich Vasilyev (born 27 July 1999) is a Russian football player.

Club career
He made his debut in the Russian Professional Football League for SFC CRFSO Smolensk on 2 April 2018 in a game against FC Tekstilshchik Ivanovo.

He made his Russian Football National League debut for FC Spartak-2 Moscow on 3 March 2019 in a game against FC Rotor Volgograd.

References

External links
 Profile by Russian Professional Football League

1999 births
Sportspeople from Krasnodar
Living people
Russian footballers
Association football midfielders
FC Spartak-2 Moscow players
FC Van players
Russian First League players
Russian Second League players
Armenian Premier League players
Russian expatriate footballers
Expatriate footballers in Armenia